Honey Hill is a hamlet on the A290 road, near the village of Blean, in the Canterbury district, in the English county of Kent.

Hamlets in Kent
City of Canterbury